David Russowski, best known as Russinho, (born in Cruz Alta, Rio Grande do Sul, September 1, 1917 - died in São Paulo, São Paulo (State), September 14, 1958) was a Brazilian football (soccer) player.

He started playing for Americano, a former club of Porto Alegre, passing by Grêmio, and finally arriving in Internacional. Russinho was brought to the club by his brother, Gildo Russowski, later President of Sport Club Internacional. In 1942, Russinho prematurely ended his career to be a lawyer. He died in 1958 after a surgical procedure.

Clubs
 Americano: 1935 - 1937
 Grêmio: 1937 - 1938
 Internacional: 1938 - 1942

Honours
 Campeonato Gaúcho: 1940, 1941 and 1942

References

1917 births
1958 deaths
Sportspeople from Rio Grande do Sul
Brazilian footballers
Brazilian Jews
Jewish footballers
Association football forwards
Sport Club Internacional players